The A2 highway is a road in Botswana running from the Namibian border at Buitepos through Jwaneng, Kanye and Lobatse to the South African border at Pioneer Gate.

The A2 is a major component of the Trans-Kalahari Corridor, which is a highway corridor that provides a direct route from Maputo in Mozambique via Pretoria to central Namibia, in particular to Windhoek and the port of Walvis Bay. There is an additional paved road from the A2 through Ghanzi to Maun.  There are only two filling stations between Gaborone and Ghanzi, one at Kang and another at Lekafane; thus distances between stations are large.  With the completion of a paved road from Ghanzi to Maun, the Trans-Kalahari highway provides a faster route to Maun than the eastern highway via Francistown. However the road is dangerous for fast moving through traffic especially at night because it is unfenced and large numbers of farm animals wander freely across it.

References

Roads in Botswana

af:Trans-Kalahari-Grootpad
de:Trans-Kalahari-Highway
ru:Транскалахарская автомагистраль